The women's 200 metres event at the 1983 Pan American Games was held in Caracas, Venezuela on 25 and 26 August.

Medalists

Results

Heats

Wind:Heat 1: +0.5 m/s, Heat 2: +0.6 m/s

Final
Wind: -0.8 m/s

References

Athletics at the 1983 Pan American Games
1983